Terrat is an administrative ward in the Arusha District of the Arusha Region of Tanzania. According to the 2002 census, the ward has a total population of 8,044.

References

Arusha District
Wards of Arusha Region